Donnie Keshawarz (born July 30, 1969) is a Canadian-born American stage, film and television actor.

Biography 
He was born on July 30, 1969 in Guelph, Ontario, Canada to Afghan parents. Keshawarz grew up in Jonesboro, Arkansas and attended Jonesboro High School. He attended Arkansas State University, and Rutgers University where he earned his bachelor degree, and the University of Missouri at Kansas City where he received his master's degree. He also studied acting under Herbert Berghof.

Since 1987, Keshawarz has appeared in numerous television roles, most notably in a recurring role in 2003 as Yusuf Auda on the television series 24 as well as a recurring role in the HBO series The Sopranos. He has also made guest appearances on Law & Order, Lost, Sex and the City, Hack, Blue Bloods, and Homeland.

Keshawarz also starred in the ABC television series Forever and in 2013 he made a brief appearance in The Wolf of Wall Street.

He has also appeared in several films, including Loving Leah (2009), The Adjustment Bureau (2011), Experimenter (2015) and Ad Astra (2019).

References

External links

1969 births
Living people
Canadian male film actors
Canadian male television actors
People from Guelph
American people of Afghan descent
Canadian people of Afghan descent
Male actors from Ontario
Arkansas State University alumni
University of Missouri–Kansas City alumni
Rutgers University alumni